Joshua James (born 21 February 2001) is a Tobagonian cricketer. In August 2021, he was named in the Jamaica Tallawahs' squad for the 2021 Caribbean Premier League. He made his Twenty20 debut on 1 September 2021, for the Jamaica Tallawahs in the 2021 Caribbean Premier League. Prior to his Twenty20 debut, he was part of the West Indies' squad for the 2020 Under-19 Cricket World Cup.

References

External links
 

2001 births
Living people
Trinidad and Tobago cricketers
Jamaica Tallawahs cricketers
Place of birth missing (living people)